Andrew Pascoe (born 1988) is an American baseball coach and former catcher and infielder. Pascoe played college baseball at the University of Evansville from 2007 to 2010 for coach Wes Carroll. He served as the head coach of the Western Illinois Leathernecks (2020–2022).

Playing career
Pascoe attended Central High School in Traverse City, Michigan where he was a member of the school's baseball team. Upon graduation from high school, was intending to enroll at the University of Evansville to play baseball. After making 11 starts as a freshman, Poscoe became the starting catcher for the Leathernecks during the 2008 season. As a junior in 2009, he was named Second Team All-Missouri Valley Conference following the season.

Coaching career
After graduation, Pascoe became a volunteer assistant at Evansville. During the summer of 2012, he was promoted to a full-time assistant in charge of hitting and recruiting coordinator. In the summer of 2017, Pascoe was named the hitting coach for Dave Schrage at Butler University.

On September 19, 2019, Pascoe was named the seventh head baseball coach in Western Illinois University history.

On June 30, 2022, Pascoe was informed that his contract would not be renewed by Western Illinois. He compiled a record of 19–86 in three seasons as head coach.

References

External links
Western Illinois Leathernecks profile

1988 births
Living people
Baseball first basemen
Baseball third basemen
Baseball catchers
Evansville Purple Aces baseball players
Evansville Purple Aces baseball coaches
Butler Bulldogs baseball coaches
Western Illinois Leathernecks baseball coaches
People from Traverse City, Michigan
Baseball coaches from Michigan
Baseball players from Michigan